Tabalta was an ancient Roman-Berber city in the province of Africa Proconsularis and of Byzacena during the late antiquity. It was a Catholic diocese led by Juan Bustos.

The site of the ancient town is tentatively given as ruins at Henchir-Gourghebi in the Sahel region of Tunisia.

The city was also the seat of a titular Bishopric of the Roman Catholic Church.
modern Henchir-Gourghebi in Tunisia.
The current bishop is Szymon Stłukowski who replaced Jose Kalluvelil of Roman Catholic Diocese of Poznań in 2015.

References

Roman towns and cities in Tunisia
Former populated places in Tunisia
Archaeological sites in Tunisia
Catholic titular sees in Africa